Svetlana Mikhaylovna Radzivil (born 17 January 1987 in Tashkent, Uzbek SSR) is an Uzbekistani high jumper. She is among Asia's top female high jumpers. She won the Asian Games title three times running (2010 to 2018) and was the Asian champion in 2015. She has also won two silver and one bronze medal at the Asian Athletics Championships. She is a two-time champion at the Asian Indoor Athletics Championships (2006 and 2014). She is a four-time Olympian (2008, 2012, 2016 and 2021).

She was born in Tashkent. She finished ninth at the 2003 World Youth Championships and thirteenth at the 2004 World Junior Championships. In 2006, she won the 2006 World Junior Championships, in a new personal best jump of 1.91 metres, and finished seventh at the 2006 Asian Games. She jumped 1.91 again in 2007. In 2008, she competed at the Olympic Games. She won the gold medal at the 17th Asian Games with a jump of 1.94 metres ahead of China's Xingjuan Zheng who claimed silver with her season's best jump of 1.92 m and Uzbekistan's Nadiya Dusanova who took home the bronze with a best leap of 1.89 m. She won gold medal in Asian Games 2018, with games record of 1.96 meters beating Nadiya Dusanova 1.94 m.

Her personal best jump is 1.97 metres, achieved in August 2012 in London and in April 2021 in Mersin.

On December 22, 2019, Svetlana Radzivil was elected to the Tashkent City Kengash of People's Deputies.

International competitions

References

External links
 
 

1987 births
Living people
Uzbekistani female high jumpers
Sportspeople from Tashkent
Olympic athletes of Uzbekistan
Athletes (track and field) at the 2008 Summer Olympics
Athletes (track and field) at the 2012 Summer Olympics
Athletes (track and field) at the 2016 Summer Olympics
Asian Games gold medalists for Uzbekistan
Asian Games medalists in athletics (track and field)
Athletes (track and field) at the 2006 Asian Games
Athletes (track and field) at the 2010 Asian Games
Athletes (track and field) at the 2014 Asian Games
Athletes (track and field) at the 2018 Asian Games
World Athletics Championships athletes for Uzbekistan
Svetlana
Soviet people of Polish descent
Uzbekistani people of Polish descent
Medalists at the 2010 Asian Games
Medalists at the 2014 Asian Games
Medalists at the 2018 Asian Games
Asian Games gold medalists in athletics (track and field)
Athletes (track and field) at the 2020 Summer Olympics
20th-century Uzbekistani women
21st-century Uzbekistani women
Islamic Solidarity Games medalists in athletics